Bouma Ferimata Coulibaly (born 9 November 1995) is an Ivorian taekwondo practitioner. At the African Taekwondo Championships she won four medals: the silver medal in 2016, 2018 and 2021 and a bronze medal in 2014.

In 2019, she represented Ivory Coast at the African Games in Rabat, Morocco and she won the gold medal in the 49 kg event. Four year earlier, in 2015, she also competed at the African Games and she won one of the bronze medals in the 46 kg event.

At the 2021 African Taekwondo Championships held in Dakar, Senegal, she won the silver medal in the women's 49 kg event.

References

External links 
 

Living people
1995 births
Place of birth missing (living people)
Ivorian female taekwondo practitioners
African Taekwondo Championships medalists
African Games medalists in taekwondo
African Games gold medalists for Ivory Coast
Competitors at the 2019 African Games
21st-century Ivorian women